Liaojiacun Town is an urban town  in Sangzhi County, Zhangjiajie, Hunan Province, China.

Administrative division
The town is divided into 9 villages and 2 communities, the following areas: Liaojiacun Community, Miaozhai Community, Mojiata Village, Chongwangxi Village, erhutian Village, Zhaigongta Village, Zajia Village, Laozhuangpo Village, Yaoqidong Village, Fengyan Village, and Maiozixi Village (廖家村社区、苗寨社区、莫家塔村、冲王溪村、二户田村、斋公塔村、咱家村、老庄坡村、妖气洞村、丰岩村、猫子溪村).

References

External links

Divisions of Sangzhi County